Horacio Manuel Cartes Jara (born 5 July 1956) is a Paraguayan businessman and politician who served as the president of Paraguay from 2013 to 2018. In 2023, he became the president of the Colorado Party. Cartes owns about two dozen businesses in his Grupo Cartes conglomerate including tobacco, soft drinks, meat production, and banking. He was president of Club Libertad football club from 2001 until 2012, and president of the national team inside the Paraguayan Football Association during the 2010 FIFA World Cup qualification. In July 2022, he was classified as "significantly corrupt" by the United States, which accuses him of involvement in transnational crime and terrorist organizations.

Business career
Cartes' father was the owner of a Cessna aircraft franchise holding company and the young Horacio studied aviation mechanics in the United States. At the age of 19, he started a currency exchange business which grew into the Banco Amambay. Over the following years, Cartes bought or helped establish 25 companies including Tabesa, the country's biggest cigarette manufacturer, and a major fruit juice bottling company.

In 1986, Cartes spent 60 days in jail during a currency fraud investigation. He was accused of making millions of dollars by obtaining a central bank loan at a preferential exchange rate and then moving it through his money exchange business before buying farm equipment in the U.S. The case was eventually dropped.

In 1989, Cartes was again jailed on charges of currency fraud for seven months. He was eventually cleared by a court.

In 2000, the anti-drug police seized a plane carrying cocaine and marijuana on his ranch. He claimed that the plane had made an emergency landing, that he had no involvement with the drug trade and that he opposed the legalization of narcotics.

Cartes' name appears in the Offshore leaks files in connection with a Cook Islands financial entity linked to Cartes' Paraguayan bank Banco Amambay. A classified WikiLeaks cable from 2010 mentioned Cartes as the focus of a money laundering investigation by the DEA.

Early political career
Until 2008, Cartes was uninvolved in politics and was not registered as a voter. He joined the conservative Colorado Party in 2009 and said he wanted to counter the swing to the left in Latin American politics. He became known as an efficient politician uncompromised by his party's past support of the military dictatorship of Alfredo Stroessner, who ruled until 1989.

In regards to allegation of his connections to the drug trade, as well as being targeted by the DEA, he said during his presidential campaign: "I wouldn't want to be president if I had ties to drug traffickers. Go to the courts and check. There's nothing, not a single charge against me."

President of Paraguay

Election
Cartes was the Colorado candidate at the 2013 presidential election. The BBC suggested that his convincing points during his campaign were the promises to raise private capital to upgrade the country's infrastructure, to modernise its public enterprises, to attract international investments, and job creation. On 21 April, 2013, he was elected President of Paraguay with 45.80% of the votes. When he took office on 15 August, it marked only the second time in the country's 202 years of independence that a ruling party peacefully transferred power to the opposition.

In regards to the impeachment of Lugo and the negative reception the country was given in the aftermath by Latin American leaders, Cartes defended the legality of the impeachment and said that Paraguay should not withdraw from Mercosur, pointing to the economic benefits of the common market and freedom of trade.

He was sworn in on August 15, 2013, and used his inaugural address to declare a war on poverty in Paraguay. His inauguration was attended by fellow conservative South American, Chilean President Sebastián Piñera, as well as Argentina's Cristina Fernández de Kirchner, Peru's Ollanta Humala, Brazil's Dilma Rousseff, Uruguay's José Mujica and Taiwan's Ma Ying-jeou.

Cabinet
Cartes announced his cabinet in August 2013 upon being sworn in. He selected mainly technocratic candidates for the positions.

Education
In 2015, massive student protests occurred in Paraguay. The demand of students was a better quality of education, demanding an increase in the education budget to reach 7% of the national GDP as requested by UNESCO; at the time education spending represented 3.9% of GDP and was one of the lowest in the region.

Foreign relations

On May 21, 2018, the Paraguayan embassy moved to Jerusalem, becoming the third country in the world to recognize the city as the diplomatic capital of Israel. However, Cartes's successor Mario Abdo Benítez reversed the decision on September 5, 2018.

Reelection attempt

The current constitution limits the president to a single five-year term. In late 2016 and early 2017, Cartes and his supporters in Congress attempted to pass a constitutional amendment to run for re-election, a move described by the opposition as "a coup". On 31 March 2017, a series of protests erupted after supporters of the amendment in the Senate voted for the amendment during a secret session in a closed office rather than on the Senate floor, during which demonstrators set fire to the Congress building. Several people were reported injured, including one protester who was killed after being hit by a shotgun blast by police, and one lower-house deputy who had to undergo surgery after being injured by rubber bullets. On 17 April, Cartes announced that he would not run for a second presidential term even if the amendment passed. On 26 April, the Chamber of Deputies rejected the proposed constitutional amendment for presidential re-election. In a June 2019 interview with the Financial Times, when asked about the amendment, Cartes said, "If you ask me today if it was a mistake, yes it was because it created an unnecessary climate."

Resignation attempt
In the 2018 Paraguayan general election, Cartes, while still President, ran for a full Senate seat, which was perceived as an attempt of extending his political influence past his presidency, and was elected. New Senators would be sworn in on 30 June 2018, six weeks before Cartes's presidential term was scheduled to end, thus the need for Cartes to leave office before the expiration of his term, as the constitution states officials can not hold two offices concurrently. Consequently, on 28 May 2018, Cartes offered his resignation as President, which would have to be agreed to by Congress. Legislators were opposed to Cartes resigning and taking up the seat, stating it was unconstitutional. The opposition, as well as dissidents within Cartes' own Colorado Party, successfully blocked Cartes's resignation, boycotting the vote, hence preventing a quorum from being present for a vote on the resignation. Cartes withdrew his bid to resign and be sworn in as a senator on 26 June 2018 after not receiving enough political support to carry through his plans.

Designation as "significantly corrupt" by the U.S.
On 22 July 2022, Antony J. Blinken, Secretary of State of the United States, announced that — 

On 26 January 2023, the United States announced further sanctions against Cartes, prohibiting him to do business with U.S. companies or have access to U.S. banks under the Magnitsky Act sanctions program. Four Cartes companies operating in the United States are also blocked from accessing the country's financial system: Tabacos USA, Bebidas USA, Dominicana Acquisition and Frigorífico Chajha.

Controversial statements
Leading to the 2013 presidential election, Cartes made controversial statements on the LGBT community, comparing it to "monkeys". He also said he would "shoot myself in the bollocks" if he were to discover a son who wanted to marry another man.

On 10 August 2018, when asked by a journalist about his response to a series of citizen protests on Yacyretá Dam deals and congressmen with pending criminal cases, Cartes responded "rubber bullets". Cartes later apologized for the remark, stating, "I want to express my apologies to the young people for the published expressions. I always encouraged them to express themselves and my goal is the peace of all Paraguayans".

References

External links

Biography of Horacio Cartes by CIDOB (in Spanish)

1956 births
Colorado Party (Paraguay) politicians
Living people
Paraguayan businesspeople
People from Asunción
Presidents of Paraguay
People named in the Pandora Papers
21st-century Paraguayan politicians
People sanctioned under the Magnitsky Act